Bebb is a surname. Notable people with the surname include:

 Ambrose Bebb (1894–1955), Welsh author and politician
 Charles Bebb (1856–1942), leading Seattle architect
 Dewi Bebb (1936–1996), Welsh rugby union player who won thirty four caps for Wales as a winger
 Guto Bebb (born 1969), Welsh MP For Aberconwy
 Gwyneth Bebb (1889–1921), Plaintiff in British 1913 testcase to open legal profession to women
 Llewellyn John Montfort Bebb (1862–1915), British academic
 Michael Schuck Bebb (1833–1895), amateur systematic botanist and salicologist in America and Europe
 Peter Bebb, special effects artist
 Richard Bebb (1927–2006), English actor of stage, screen and radio
 William Ambrose Bebb (1894–1953), Welsh language writer, critic and scholar
 William Bebb (1802–1873), Whig politician from Ohio

See also
 Bebb and Gould, architectural partnership active in Seattle from 1914 to 1939
 Bebb Travel, later Crossgates Coaches former Welsh bus and coach operator